Sweet bean paste is a food ingredient used throughout East Asian cuisine, primarily as a filling for sweet desserts and pastries.

Production 
The beans are usually boiled without sugar, mashed, and diluted into a slurry. The slurry is then strained through a sieve to remove the husks. The resulting liquid is then filtered and squeezed dry using cheesecloth, and then finally sweetened. Oil in the form of either vegetable oil or lard is usually added to the relatively dry paste to improve its texture and mouthfeel.

Oiled sweet bean paste is mainly found as fillings for Chinese pastries, while un-oiled sweet bean pastes can be used to make tong sui. Japanese pastries use primarily un-oiled sweet bean pastes.

Types
There are several types of sweet bean paste:
 Oil bean paste – made from azuki beans; dark brown or black in colour from the addition of sugar and animal fat or vegetable oil, and further cooking; sometimes also includes Sweet Osmanthus flavor
 Mung bean paste – made from mung beans and dull reddish purple in colour
 Red bean paste – made from azuki beans and dark red in colour
 White bean paste – made from navy beans and greyish off-white in colourphoto
 Black bean potato paste – made from black soybean powder and potatoes; used in Beijing cuisine and other cuisines of northern Chinaphoto

Others
There are a number of other pastes used in Chinese cuisine, primarily as fillings for dessert items. Although not made from beans, they share similar usage and are equally popular. They are very similar in flavor and texture to sweet bean paste. These include:

Lotus seed paste
Black sesame paste

Gallery

See also
 Bean dip
 Fermented bean paste

References
Hsiung, Deh-Ta (2000). The Chinese Kitchen: A Book of Essential Ingredients with Over 200 Easy and Authentic Recipes. Foreword by Ken Hom. St. Martin's Press. . .

Chinese cuisine
East Asian cuisine
Food paste
Japanese cuisine
Korean cuisine